Herbert Arthur Salt (1880 – 1967) was an English footballer who played in the Football League for Stoke.

Career
Salt was born in Stoke-upon-Trent and played for Newcastle St Peter's before joining Stoke in 1902. He made one appearance for Stoke which came in a 3–0 win over West Bromwich Albion in April 1903. He later played for Stafford Rangers.

Career statistics

References

English footballers
Stafford Rangers F.C. players
Stoke City F.C. players
English Football League players
1880 births
1967 deaths
Association football goalkeepers